Doctor Alexandre Manette is a character in Charles Dickens' 1859 novel A Tale of Two Cities. He is Lucie's father, a brilliant physician, and spent eighteen years "in secret" as a prisoner in the Bastille prior to the French Revolution. He is imprisoned because in the course of his medical practice he learns of abusive actions by two members of the aristocratic Evrémonde family. While realizing the power at court of nobles such as the Evrémondes, Manette reports them to a minister of the royal government. He is seized from his young family and imprisoned under a lettre de cachet.

Character and plot
At the start of the novel, Manette has been recently released from the Bastille after a long imprisonment. He is briefly given shelter in Paris by his former servant Ernest Defarge (who will subsequently be a leader of the storming of the Bastille) and is then reunited with his daughter Lucie. He does nothing but make shoes, a pastime that he adopted to distract himself from the tortures of prison. He is clearly not in his mind during this time; he speaks only when necessary, and has become so used to being a prisoner that he can hardly bear light or freedom. As he overcomes his past as a prisoner, due to his daughter's love and devotion to him, however, he resumes his occupation as a physician in England, and proves to be a kind, loving father who prizes his daughter’s happiness above all things. He even blesses her marriage to Charles Darnay; the son of the aristocrat who was responsible for his imprisonment (Darnay has completely renounced his family's ill-gotten fortune and is a good fellow, unaware of the harm that his father once inflicted on his current father-in-law). When Charles Darnay is arrested in France during the French Revolution, Manette is his witness that he is innocent. Unfortunately, Darnay is arrested again, due to a diary that Manette wrote when he was in jail, which sends Darnay back to prison. Darnay is condemned for his uncle's sins, but Sydney Carton (out of love for Lucie Manette), disguises himself as Charles and takes his place in the guillotine and dies for him.

Analysis
Dickens uses Doctor Manette in his novel, A Tale of Two Cities, to illustrate one of the dominant motifs of the novel: the essential mystery that surrounds every human being. As Jarvis Lorry makes his way toward France to recover Manette, the narrator reflects that "every human creature is constituted to be that profound secret and mystery to every other." For much of the novel, the cause of Manette’s incarceration remains a mystery both to the other characters and to the reader. Even when the story concerning the evil Marquis St. Evrémonde comes to light, the conditions of Manette's imprisonment remain hidden. Though the reader never learns exactly how Manette suffered, his relapses into trembling sessions of shoemaking evidence the depth of his misery.
Like Carton, Manette over the course of the novel undergoes drastic change. He is transformed from an insensate prisoner who mindlessly cobbles shoes into a man of distinction. The contemporary reader tends to understand human individuals not as fixed entities but rather as impressionable and reactive beings, affected and influenced by their surroundings and by the people with whom they interact. In Dickens' age, however, this notion was rather revolutionary. Manette’s transformation testifies to the tremendous impact of relationships and experience on life. The strength that he displays while dedicating himself to rescuing Darnay seems to confirm the lesson that Carton learns by the end of the novel — that not only does one's treatment of others play an important role in others' personal development, but also that the very worth of one's life is determined by its impact on the lives of others. His daughter "recalls him to life" after he is rescued from his cell in the Bastille. At the end of the first book of Tale of Two Cities he is asked:
"'I hope you care to be recalled to life?' And the old man answers: 'I can't say.'"

Through the novel, Dr. Manette is a proven "good soul", respected by the revolutionaries as well as his family. However his memories of the time in unjust imprisonment has had a negative effect on him. Obsessive making of shoes is only a distraction from the feelings he does not want to deal with. The shoes could be a symbol of freedom.

Cinematic and theatrical portrayals
 In the 1935 film A Tale of Two Cities, Dr. Manette is played by Henry B. Walthall.
 In the 1958 film adaptation, Dr. Alexandre Manette is played by Stephen Murray.
 In the 1980 TV movie A Tale of Two Cities, Dr. Manette is played by Peter Cushing.
 In the 2008 Broadway musical adaptation of A Tale of Two Cities, Dr. Alexandre Manette is played by Gregg Edelman.

Notes

Literary characters introduced in 1859
A Tale of Two Cities characters
Fictional physicians
Fictional French people in literature
Male characters in film
Male characters in literature